ISO 11992 is a CAN based vehicle bus standard by the heavy duty truck industry. It is used for communication between the tractor and one or more trailers. Its full title is "Road vehicles -- Interchange of digital information on electrical connections between towing and towed vehicles".

The protocol structure is similar to SAE J1939. The main differences are timing, bus voltage level and the structure of the message's 29-bit identifier.

External links

Official texts 
 ISO 11992-1:2003 - Part 1: Physical and data-link layers
 ISO 11992-2:2014 - Part 2: Application layer for brakes and running gear
 ISO 11992-3:2003 - Part 3: Application layer for equipment other than brakes and running gear
 ISO 11992-3:2003/Amd 1:2008
 ISO 11992-4:2014 Part 4: Diagnostic communication

11992
Computer buses